"One More Time" is a song by German Eurodance and pop music project Real McCoy, released in 1997 as the lead single from their second album, One More Time. It was a top 5 hit in Australia, where it peaked at number three and was certified platinum. The single also reached number-one on the Canadian Dance/Urban chart and number 14 on the Billboard Hot Dance Club Songs chart in the US.

Critical reception
Larry Flick from Billboard wrote, "It's been two years since Real McCoy helped turn the tide for dance music at pop radio with "Another Night", "Runaway", and "Come and Get Your Love". And while there are dozens of competent, similar-sounding acts vying for attention, there's truly nothing like the real thing—as proved by this giddy preview into the group's forthcoming sophomore release. The beats race with Euro-NRG verve, and the chorus is downright unshakable. The combination of chorus-chirping and verse-rapping continues to work extremely well." Diana Valois from The Morning Call described it as "typical pumped-up Eurodisco. Bright and irresistible, it ends with O-J begging, "Do it just one more time ..."." Chuck Campbell from Scripps Howard News Service said the band "revives its slap-happy energy" on the track.

Chart performance
"One More Time" was a major hit on several charts, although it didn't reach the same level of success as the band's first singles. It peaked at number-one on the RPM Dance/Urban chart and number eight on the Canadian Hot 100 in Canada. The single was successful also in Australia, where it reached number three, making it the second most successful song by the band there, after "Another Night". In the United States, it was a moderate success, going to number 14 on the Billboard Hot Dance Club Songs chart and number 27 on the Billboard Hot 100. In Europe, "One More Time" peaked within the Top 30 in Iceland, reaching number 25. It was also a Top 90 hit in Germany, reaching number 85. The single was awarded with a platinum record in Australia, with a sale of 70,000 units.

Music video
The accompanying music video for "One More Time" was shot in 1997 and was directed by Scottish director Paul Boyd. It features the band performing the song in a night club. The video was uploaded to YouTube in October 2009. In September 2020, it has got more than 4.9 million views.

Official versions

 CD maxi (Germany)
"One More Time" (Original Radio Mix) — 3:51
"One More Time" (Club Attack Mix II) — 6:50
"One More Time" (Bass Bumpers Mix) — 5:38
"One More Time" (UK Radio Mix) — 5:05

 CD maxi - Remixed (Germany)
"One More Time" (Sequential One Remix) — 5:00
"One More Time" (Johnny "Vicious" Dub) — 8:47
"One More Time" (Mox Epoque's Mad Mix) — 7:16
"One More Time" (Jay Ray Remix) — 6:00
"One More Time" (Dub Mix) — 5:51
"One More Time" (Mox Epoque's Lazy Dub) — 6:21

 CD maxi - The Remixes (US)
"One More Time" (Tony Moran Extended Mix) — 7:49
"One More Time" (Berman Brothers Club Mix) — 6:50
"One More Time" (Bass Bumper Mix) — 5:38
"One More Time" (Johnny "Vicious" Dub) — 8:47
"One More Time" (Berman Brothers Dub) — 5:50

 CD maxi - The Remixes (UK)
"One More Time" (US 7" Version) — 3:59
"One More Time" (Tony Moran Extended Mix) — 7:49
"One More Time" (Bass Bumpers Mix) — 5:38
"One More Time" (Sequential One Mix) — 5:00
"One More Time" (Club Attack Mix II) — 6:50
"One More Time" (Jay Ray Remix 1) — 6:00

 12" promo vinyl - The Underground Remixes (US)
A1: "One More Time" (Jay Ray Mix) — 5:37
A2: "One More Time" (Phear No Mix) — 6:52
B1: "One More Time" (Sequential One Mix) — 5:00
B2: "One More Time" (TM 4 A.M. Tribal Dub) — 7:33

Charts and certifications

Weekly charts

Year-end charts

Certification

References

1997 songs
1997 singles
Arista Records singles
Music videos directed by Paul Boyd
Real McCoy (band) songs
Songs written by Jürgen Wind